Sportpark Duinwetering is a sports complex located in Noordwijk, Netherlands. There are six Association football fields on the complex.

Main field 
The main field at Sportpark Duinwetering is home to Tweede Divisie side VV Noordwijk.  The field is made of artificial turf and has a capacity of 3,500.

The field hosted Noordwijk's 3-2 win over Sparta Rotterdam in the 2018–19 KNVB Cup first round, with an attendance of 5,900.

References

Sports complexes
Noordwijk
VV Noordwijk